Cédric Rossier (born 9 February 1957) is a Swiss former professional racing cyclist. He rode in the 1982 Tour de France.

References

External links

1957 births
Living people
Swiss male cyclists
People from Gros-de-Vaud District
Sportspeople from the canton of Vaud